The women's 10 km pursuit competition at the Biathlon World Championships 2023 was held on 12 February 2023.

Results
The race was started at 13:25.

References

Women's pursuit